John Stalker (1939–2019) was a British police officer, author and television personality.

John Stalker may also refer to:

 John Stalker (rugby union) (1881–1931), New Zealand rugby union player
 John Stalker (footballer) (born 1959), Scottish footballer